David Paulsen may refer to:

David Paulsen (producer), American screenwriter.
David L. Paulsen (born 1936), American philosopher
Dave Paulsen (born 1964), American basketball coach

See also
David Paulson, American football player
David E. Paulson, Wisconsin politician